California cuisine is a food movement that originated in California. The cuisine focuses on dishes that are driven by local and sustainable ingredients with an attention to seasonality and an emphasis on the bounty of the region.

The food is historically chef-driven.  Dishes and meals low in saturated fats and high in fresh vegetables and fruits with lean meats and seafood from the California coast often define the style.  

The term "California cuisine" arose as a result of culinary movements in the last decades of the 20th century and should not be confused with the traditional foods of California. 

French cuisine, American cuisine, Italian cuisine, Mexican cuisine, Chinese cuisine, and Japanese cuisine have all influenced Californian fusion cuisine, though this is by no means a complete list of influencing cultures.

History
One of the first proponents of using fresh, locally available foods was Helen Evans Brown, who became friends with James Beard after publishing Helen Brown's West Coast Cookbook in 1952. She advocated using fruits and spices available in one's own neighborhood, forgoing poor grocery store substitutes, as well as fresh seafood, caught locally. 

The book received wide acclaim and became the "template" for what is now thought of as California cuisine.
Alice Waters, who opened Chez Panisse restaurant in 1971 in Berkeley, California, has contributed significantly to the concept of California Cuisine. 

About the same time, in Yountville in the Napa Valley, Sally Schmitt began serving single-menu monthly dinners that emphasized local ingredients, continuing the concept when she and her husband Don opened The French Laundry in 1978. 

In Los Angeles, Wolfgang Puck was also an early pioneer of California cuisine; starting with his work at Patrick Terrail's Ma Maison, and further work with Ed LaDou on California-style pizza at Spago and Asian fusion at Chinois on Main.  

Mark Peel, who worked for both Waters and Puck, went on to co-found La Brea Bakery and Campanile Restaurant with his then-wife Nancy Silverton. As executive chef, he mentored other up-and-coming chefs. “Campanile has played an important role in shaping the cuisine of Southern California and beyond, not just through its menu but also through the many graduates of its kitchen.” 

Daniel Patterson, a more modern proponent of the style, emphasizes vegetables and foraged foods while maintaining the traditional emphasis on local foods and presentation.

Specialty dishes
 California-style pizza was popularized by Alice Waters, Ed LaDou and Wolfgang Puck and has caught on as a national trend in the United States; pizzas focus less on tradition and more on creativity and California-grown ingredients.

See also

 New American cuisine
 The French Laundry
 Mexican-American cuisine

References

External links
 California Fusion wikibook
 Timeline: The Introduction of Asian foods to California at FoodTimeline.org

Food and drink in California
Cuisine of the San Francisco Bay Area
Cuisine of the Western United States
American cuisine by state